Shallow-water blackout refers to loss of consciousness due to hypoxia during a dive associated with a shallow depth in differing causative circumstances. The following situations may be referred to as shallow water blackout:

 , blackout which occurs when all phases of a breathhold dive have taken place in shallow water (i.e., where depressurisation is not a significant factor). The mechanism for this type of shallow water blackout is lack of oxygen expedited by low carbon dioxide levels, as a consequence of voluntary hyperventilation before the dive. Blackouts which occur in swimming pools are probably driven only by excessive hyperventilation, with no significant influence from pressure change.
 , loss of consciousness caused by lack of oxygen to the brain at the end of a deep breath-hold dive during the latter part of the ascent or immediately after surfacing. This is due to lowered oxygen partial pressure caused by a reduction in ambient pressure. Blackout in the shallow stage of ascent from deep free-dives may also sometimes be called "deep-water blackout".
 , one of which is a hypoxic loss of consciousness while ascending on a rebreather because of a sudden uncompensated drop of oxygen partial pressure in the breathing loop. This may occur as a result of the pressure reduction during ascent, usually associated with manual closed-circuit and semi-closed-circuit rebreathers. A similar effect can occur in open circuit scuba if a diver continues to breathe a hypoxic gas intended for avoiding oxygen toxicity in the deep sector, at a depth shallower than the minimum operating depth for the gas, but this is usually just called hypoxia. 

Underwater diving physiology